This is a List of Colonial Heads of Niger for the period of French Colonial rule.  While French control of some of the areas of modern Niger began in the 1890s, a formal Military Territory of Zinder was formed on 23 July 1900. Full independence from France was declared on 10 November 1960 with the formation of the Nigerien First Republic.

For continuation after independence, see: Heads of state of Niger

See also 
Niger
Heads of state of Niger
Presidents of Niger
Lists of office-holders

References

Niger: Rulers.org.  Accessed 2009-04-15.

History of Niger
 
Niger
Colonial heads
Government of Niger
France–Niger relations